Castel Lagopesole, or simply Lagopesole, is a village and civil parish (frazione) of the municipality (comune) of Avigliano, in Basilicata, southern Italy. It has a population of 652.

History
The name derives from the presence of the lake near the town of the same name (Lacus Pensilis), dried up at the beginning of the twentieth century.

Lagopesole, between the eighth and tenth centuries, played a military role for the control of the ancient Via Herculea, linking Melfi and Potenza.

At the top of Lagopesole is located a castle, attributed to Frederick II that was probably built between 1242 and 1250. A distinguishing feature of this castle from all the others attributed to Frederick II is the presence within it of a real church (not a simple chapel) in an austere Romanesque style.

Pope Innocent II and Abbot Rinaldo of Montecassino met there, in the presence of Emperor Lothair II of Saxony during the war against Roger the Norman. In 1268 and 1294, Charles I of Anjou stayed at the castle. In 1416, both this fortress and the Melfi castle were acquired by the Caracciolo family. In 1531, Emperor Charles V donated it to the Doria family.

In the nineteenth century, the castle was the refuge of bandits, led by Carmine "Donatelli" Crocco, who during April 7, 1861, occupied it with another 400 brigands.

Geography
Lagopesole is located 27 km in north of Potenza and 33 in south of Melfi, and is crossed by the National Road "SS 93". It is 5 km far from Filiano and 20 from Avigliano. In the zone of Pian del Lago it is situated the bed of a dry lake, Lago Pesole.

Transport
The village is served by the national road SS 658, part of a highway linking Potenza and Foggia. The railway station is located in the surrounding village of Sarnelli, 3 km in south, and is part of the Foggia-Potenza line.

Gallery

References

External links

 Office of Tourism of Castel Lagopesole
 Site about the castle of Castel Lagopesole

Frazioni of the Province of Potenza